Lauri Vahtre (born 22 March 1960) is an Estonian politician, historian, translator and writer.

Education and career
Lauri Vahtre was born in Tartu. He graduated from Tartu Secondary School Nr 2 in 1978 and from Tartu University history department in 1984 (1988 PhD). From 1983 to 1985 he worked as a senior research fellow in the Estonian Open Air Museum, then continued his postgraduate studies. From 1988 to 1992 he worked as a senior researcher in the Institute of History of the Estonian Academy of Sciences, from 1989 to 1992 as a senior teacher at the Tartu University.
As a historian, Lauri Vahtre is known as a populariser of history and a co-author of several schoolbooks. His research work has concentrated on the history of Estonian Bar Association and Soviet time mentality among other topics. 2015-2020 Vahtre lead a group of historians, creating 2-volume research "History of the Estonian War of Independence" which was published 2021. See: https://et.wikipedia.org/wiki/Eesti_Vabadussõja_ajalugu

Political career
Lauri Vahtre joined politics during the Singing Revolution together with his university mate Mart Laar. Just before graduation Vahtre was expelled from the Tartu State University because of his patriotic views and activities, so he had to complete his studies as an extern.  Together with Laar and other patriots they formed a political association, which in 1992 developed into a National Coalition Party "Pro Patria" (Rahvuslik Koonderakond "Isamaa"). Vahtre was a member of the Congress of Estonia and from 1991 to 1992 a member of the Constitutional Assembly. In 1992, as a result of the victory of Pro Patria in the national elections, Lauri Vahtre was elected member of the VII Riigikogu. He became one of the political leaders of the party and was re-elected to the parliament in 1995 and 1999. In 2003 the party faced a loss in the parliamentary election and Vahtre did not get elected. He returned to the parliament again in 2007 and became a member of the parliamentary Committee on Cultural Affairs as well as the National Heritage Association.

International activity
In the parliament Lauri Vahtre was a member of the Estonia-India Parliamentary Group as well as the Estonia-Croatia Parliamentary Group. He also belonged to the Taiwan and Tibet Support Groups.
From 2001 to 2003 Lauri Vahtre was a member of the Parliamentary Assembly of the Council of Europe. He was a rapporteur on Moldova (together with Josette Durrieu).

Awards
3rd class Order of the National Coat of Arms (2001)

Personal
Lauri Vahtre's father was the historian Sulev Vahtre. His brother is the artist Silver Vahtre.

Membership in associations
Lauri Vahtre is a member of Estonian Students' Society, member of Isamaa.

Books (selection)
Torm, Varrak 2010, 
Absurdi impeerium, Tammerraamat 2007, 
Ajaloo pööripäevad (vol 2), Tammerraamat 2007, 
Ajaloo pööripäevad, Tammerraamat 2006, 
Eesti Advokatuuri ajalugu 1919–1994, Tallinn 2005, 
Eesti rahva lugu, Ilo 2005, 
Suur pettumus, Varrak 2002, 
Eesti kultuuri ajalugu. Lühiülevaade, Virgela 2000, 
Eestlase aeg, Varrak 2000, 
Meenutusi kadunud maailmast, ehk, Keskkoolist, ülikoolist, matkadest, malevast, väljakaevamistest ja muust aastail 1975–1984", Tallinn 1999, 
Teine lugemine, Virgela 1998,

Published in English
Empire of the absurd: a brief history of the absurdities of the Soviet Union / foreword by Mart Laar ; [translation from Estonian: Tarmo Heyduck]. Ontario, 2010. 201 pages. . This book is dedicated to probably the greatest flowering of man-made absurdity in history - The Soviet Union
Estonian home / [photos:] Henri van Noordenburg ; text by Lauri Vahtre ; [design: Piia Ruber] [Tallinn] : Eesti Instituut, 2008 ([Tallinn : Folger Art]) 44 pages. 
Humanism vs humanity / translated by Enn Veldi. Tallinn : Grenader, 2008. 163 pages. Original title: Suur pettumus ehk inimene, ühiskond ja inimõigused. 
Republic of Estonia 90 / [text of the exhibition catalogue: Lauri Vahtre ; graphic design: Angelika Schneider] [Tallinn : Eesti Instituut, 2008]. 48 pages. 
Good old Swedish era – how long did it last and how good was it really? // Life in Estonia, Summer 2008, pages 18–22. Article bout the historical period between 1561–1710, when Estonia was part of the Kingdom of Sweden.
The Red Book of the Peoples of the Russian Empire / 1993 / Eesti Keele Institute/Institute of the Estonian Language / Consultants: Ants Viires and Lauri Vahtre / Edited by Andrew Humpries and Krista Mits;

Translations from English
McLynn, Frank. Napoleon. Tallinn, Varrak, 2002, 
Quinton, Anthony. Hume. Tallinn, Varrak, 2000, 
Ayers, Michael. Locke. Tallinn, Varrak, 2000, 
Tanner, Michael. Schopenhauer. Tallinn, Varrak, 2000, 
Berman, David. Berkeley. Tallinn, Varrak, 2000, 
Hughes, Lindsey. Peeter Suur (Peter the Great). Tallinn, Varrak 2005, 
Cornwell, Bernard. Sharpe (three volumes). Tallinn, Varrak 1998,

Films
Detsembrikuumus (December Heat) : [drama : video] / director: Asko Kase; written by: Lauri Vahtre, Mihkel Ulman. Tallinn: Home Entertainment Group (distributor), 2009. DVD.
Tuulepealne maa (Windward Land) : [12 episodes : drama : video] / director: Ain Prosa ; written by: Mihkel Ulman, Lauri Vahtre. Tallinn: Sonatiin (distributor) : BEC, 2008.

References

External links
 Lauri Vahtre at Isamaa ja Res Publica Liit
 Lauri Vahtre at Riigikogu

1960 births
Living people
Writers from Tartu
Politicians from Tartu
Pro Patria Union politicians
Isamaa politicians
Members of the Riigikogu, 1992–1995
Members of the Riigikogu, 1999–2003
Members of the Riigikogu, 2007–2011
Members of the Riigikogu, 2011–2015
20th-century Estonian historians
Historians of Estonia
Miina Härma Gymnasium alumni
University of Tartu alumni
Recipients of the Order of the National Coat of Arms, 3rd Class
20th-century Estonian politicians
21st-century Estonian politicians
Members of the Riigikogu, 1995–1999
21st-century Estonian historians